The 1999–2000 Ukrainian Hockey League season was the seventh season of the Ukrainian Hockey League, the top level of ice hockey in Ukraine. Eight teams participated in the league, and HC Sokil Kyiv won the championship.

Regular season

Playoffs
Semifinals
HC Sokil Kyiv 8 - HK Kryzhynka Kyiv 0
HC Berkut 8 - Politechnik Yasya Kyiv 1
Final
HC Berkut 3 - HC Sokil Kyiv 1
3rd place
Politechnik Yasya Kyiv 10 - HK Kryzhynka Kyiv 1

External links
1999-2000 Standings and results. Ukrainian Ice Hockey Federation

UKHL
Ukrainian Hockey Championship seasons
Ukr